Tawa may refer to:

Places 
Tawa, Edmonton, a residential neighbourhood in Edmonton, Canada
Tawa, New Zealand, a suburb of Wellington
Tawa AFC, an association football club
Tawa College, a coeducational school in Tawa, New Zealand
Tawa, Dahanu, a village in Maharashtra, India
Tawa River, in central India
Tawa, Toowoomba, a heritage-listed house in Queensland, Australia

Other uses
Tava, also called Tawa(h), a frying pan originating on the Indian subcontinent
Tawa (crater), an impact crater on Rhea
Tawa hallae, a dinosaur named after the solar deity of the Puebloan peoples (using the Hopi name)
Tawa (tree), after which the New Zealand suburb is named
An early variation on the name of the Ottawa tribe
Tawa (mythology), a solar deity in Hopi mythology
Bert Marcelo, nicknamed "Tawa", Filipino comedian.

See also
Tava (disambiguation)
Tawas City, Michigan, U.S.